Gordon Tosh (born 10 March 1938) was a Scottish footballer who played for Dundee, Forfar Athletic, Dundee United and Dumbarton.

References

1938 births
Scottish footballers
Dumbarton F.C. players
Dundee F.C. players
Dundee United F.C. players
Forfar Athletic F.C. players
Scottish Football League players
Living people
Association football defenders